Hatfield is a civil parish in the metropolitan borough of Doncaster, South Yorkshire, England.  The parish contains 32 listed buildings that are recorded in the National Heritage List for England.  Of these, two are listed at Grade I, the highest of the three grades, and the others are at Grade II, the lowest grade.  The parish contains the villages of Hatfield and Hatfield Woodhouse, and the surrounding area.   Most of the listed buildings are houses, cottages and associated structures, farmhouses and farm buildings.  The other listed buildings include churches and associated items, a former charity school, two former tower windmills, three mileposts, and a cemetery chapel.


Key

Buildings

References

Citations

Sources

 

Lists of listed buildings in South Yorkshire
Buildings and structures in the Metropolitan Borough of Doncaster